Raimonds Tiguls (born 5 December 1972 in Talsi, Latvian SSR) is a Latvian ambient and electronic musician, composer, and producer.

Career
He has received multiple Annual Latvian Music Recording Awards. In 2003, his album Bay Lounge also won the prize for Best Instrumental, Film or Theatre Musical Album. In 2006, his album Zils. Balts. Zaļš. won the prize for Best Contemporary Folk Music Album, as well as Best Instrumental, Film or Theatre Musical Album. He is credited as the main planner and organiser of concerts at Tiguļkalns in Talsi with international guest performers.

Two of Tiguls' songs – Lec, saulīte!, with lyrics by Rasa Bugavičute-Pēce, and Dod, dieviņi!, with lyrics by Nora Ikstena – have been performed at the closing concert of the Latvian Song and Dance Festival.

Discography

Albums 
 Moonlight sound design (1999)
 Don't turn away (2001)
 De angelis (2001; together with the Schola Cantorum Riga)
 Bay Lounge (2003)
 Vēstule Ziemassvētkos (2009)
 Carmina (2011)
 Islands (2012)
 Vaira. Saules Dainas (2016; together with Vaira Vīķe-Freiberga)

References

External links 
 Official website (in English)
 Musica Baltica: Raimonds Busulis
 Delfi.lv: Temas – Raimonds Tiguls

1972 births
Living people
Latvian composers
Latvian musicians
People from Talsi